Geir Barvik (born 19 May 1958, in Bø, Telemark) is a Norwegian civil servant. He served as Managing Director of the Norwegian State Housing Bank from 2001 to 2010 and as Director-General of the Directorate of Integration and Diversity from 2010 to 2016. From 2016 he is a Director in the Ministry of Justice and Public Security.

Career

Barvik worked at the Norwegian State Housing Bank and in the Ministry of Local Government and Regional Development, where he was a Principal Officer from 1991, Assistant Director General from 1992 and Deputy Director General from 1994.

He was appointed as Managing Director of the Norwegian State Housing Bank by the King-in-Council in 2001, and held the position until 2010. In 2010 he was appointed by the King-in-Council as the Director General of the Directorate of Integration and Diversity. In 2016 he was succeeded by Libe Rieber-Mohn.

Background

Barvik grew up in Bø, Telemark, and lives in Asker. He is married and has two children. He was formerly a member of the Socialist Left Party, but quit the party due to its opposition to the EU in the early 1990s.

References

1958 births
Living people
People from Bø, Telemark
Socialist Left Party (Norway) politicians
Norwegian civil servants
Norwegian bankers
Directors of government agencies of Norway